"Unkind" is a song by Acumen Nation from the album More Human Heart.

Unkind may also refer to:

"Unkind" (song), a song by Sloan from the album The Double Cross
"Unkind", a song by the Mighty Lemon Drops from the album Sound ... Goodbye to Your Standards

See also